Demo 1 may refer to:

Spaceflight
Crew Dragon Demo-1, or SpaceX Demo-1 or Crew Demo-1, the first orbital test of Dragon 2
SpaceX COTS Demo Flight 1, the first orbital spaceflight of Dragon
SNC Demo-1, or Dream Chaser Demo-1, the planned first flight of Dream Chaser

Music

Albums
Demo 01 (EP), by Pentagon, 2017
The Demo Album 1, by Stephen Bishop, 2003
Demo 1, a demo by Pentagram Chile, 1987
Unreleased Demo #1, a cassette by Neutral Milk Hotel, 1993
Demo 1, a demo by Inhume, 1995
Demo 1: 2005, a demo by Diocletian, 2005
Demo 1, a demo by The Shondes, 2006
Demo 1, an EP by Britta Persson, 2004

Songs
"Demo 1", soundtrack of Kvadrat, DJ Pushkarev, 2013
"Démo 1", single, Fils de Pul, 2014; a cover of "Louie Louie"